Odostomia deplexa, common name the unwoven pyramid-shell,  is a species of sea snail, a marine gastropod mollusc in the family Pyramidellidae, the pyrams and their allies.

Description
The length of the shell measures 3 mm.

Distribution

References

 OBIS : Odostomia deplexa
 Tate, R. & May, W.L. 1900. Descriptions of new genera and species of Australian Mollusca (chiefly Tasmanian). Transactions of the Royal Society of South Australia 24(2): 90-103
 Tate, R. & May, W.L. 1901. A revised census of the marine Mollusca of Tasmania. Proceedings of the Linnean Society of New South Wales 26(3): 344-471
 Pritchard, G.B. & Gatliff, J.H. 1906. Catalogue of the marine shells of Victoria. Part IX. With complete index to the whole catalogue. Proceedings of the Royal Society of Victoria 18(2): 39–92
 May, W.L. 1921. A Checklist of the Mollusca of Tasmania. Hobart, Tasmania : Government Printer 114 pp. 
 May, W.L. 1923. An illustrated index of Tasmanian shells: with 47 plates and 1052 species. Hobart : Government Printer 100 pp.
 Cotton, B.C. & Godfrey, F.K. 1932. South Australian shells (including descriptions of new genera and species). Part 6. South Australian Naturalist 14(1): 16-44
 Cotton, B.C. 1959. Chapter 5. South Australian Gastropoda. Marine, Estuarine, land and Freshwater. pp. 332–448 in Cotton, B.C. South Australian Mollusca. Archaeogastropoda. Handbook of the Flora and Fauna of South Australia. Adelaide : South Australian Government Printer 449 pp.
 Macpherson, J.H. & Gabriel, C.J. 1962. Marine molluscs of Victoria. Melbourne : Melbourne University Press & National Museum of Victoria 475 pp. 
 Grove, S.J., Kershaw, R.C., Smith, B.J. & Turner, E. 2006. A Systematic List of the Marine Molluscs of Tasmania. Launceston, Tasmania : Queen Victoria Museum and Art Gallery 120 pp.

External links
 Museum Victoria : Odostomia deplexa

deplexa
Gastropods described in 1900
Gastropods of Australia